The Alexandria toadlet (Uperoleia orientalis)  is a species of frog in the family Myobatrachidae.
It is endemic to Australia.
Its natural habitats are subtropical or tropical swamps and swamps.

References

Sources

Uperoleia
Amphibians of Queensland
Amphibians of the Northern Territory
Amphibians described in 1940
Taxonomy articles created by Polbot
Frogs of Australia